Alikin is a Russian masculine surname, its feminine counterpart is Alikina. It may refer to
Pavel Alikin (born 1984), Russian football player
Kristina Alikina (born 1986), Russian basketball player
Vladimir Alikin (born 1957), Soviet biathlete

Russian-language surnames